The Virtual XI Tour was a concert tour by the heavy metal band Iron Maiden from 22 April 1998 to 12 December 1998. As with their previous tour, several of the band's U.S. shows had to be cancelled after vocalist Blaze Bayley had issues with his voice, this time reportedly from an allergic reaction to pollen and dust while the group were in Nevada and Arizona. The band later made up the Los Angeles and San Diego dates. This would be Iron Maiden's last tour with Bayley as then former vocalist Bruce Dickinson would return to the group the following year.

Following the more basic stage sets that they had been using following 1988's Seventh Tour of a Seventh Tour, the band returned to a more elaborate stage set in 1998. The tour also saw the group make their first visits to Turkey and Malta.

Setlist
"Dance Of The Knights", theme from Romeo And Juliet, served as the intro. 
"Futureal" (from Virtual XI, 1998)
"The Angel and the Gambler" (from Virtual XI, 1998)
"Man on the Edge" (from The X Factor, 1995)
"Lightning Strikes Twice" (from Virtual XI, 1998)
"Heaven Can Wait" (from Somewhere in Time, 1986)
"The Clansman" (from Virtual XI, 1998)
"When Two Worlds Collide" (from Virtual XI, 1998)
"Lord of the Flies" (from The X Factor, 1995)
"2 Minutes to Midnight" (from Powerslave, 1984)
"The Educated Fool" (from Virtual XI, 1998)
"Sign of the Cross" (from The X Factor, 1995)
"Hallowed Be Thy Name" (from The Number of the Beast, 1982)
"Afraid to Shoot Strangers" (from Fear of the Dark, 1992)
"The Evil That Men Do" (from Seventh Son of a Seventh Son, 1988)
"The Clairvoyant" (from Seventh Son of a Seventh Son, 1988)
"Fear of the Dark" (from Fear of the Dark, 1992)
"Iron Maiden" (from Iron Maiden, 1980)

 Encore:
"The Number of the Beast" (from The Number of the Beast, 1982)
"The Trooper" (from Piece of Mind, 1983)
"Sanctuary" (from Iron Maiden, 1980)

Notes:
 This was Iron Maiden's last tour to feature "Fortunes of War" or any Virtual XI songs aside from "Futureal" & "The Clansman" in the setlists. 
 "Fortunes of War" was played only in Lille (the first show). In Nancy, it was replaced by "Murders in the Rue Morgue" (from Killers, 1981) (also played in Paris and some other shows). In Genova, they played "Lord Of The Flies" which stayed in the set for the most of the shows till middle autumn.
 "Don't Look to the Eyes of a Stranger" (from Virtual XI, 1998) was played only at the first 3 gigs and was replaced by "Sign Of The Cross".
 "The Clairvoyant" were dropped from some sets most notably in the U.S. and towards the end of the tour in South America.
 "The Educated Fool" was dropped from the set on the last 3 shows.

Tour dates 

  This was a secret concert that the band performed under the name "The Angel and the Gamblers".

External links
 Official website
 Virtual XI World Tour Dates

References

Iron Maiden concert tours
1998 concert tours

fi:Virtual XI#Maailmankiertue